Eon Films is a Mexico City-based company that produces and distributes films. It is directed by Miguel Alejandro Reina and owned by a board of directors, including filmmaker César Amigó.

Some of its films are Un aliado en el tiempo (2009) (An ally in time), Seguro de vida (2004) (Life insurance).

References 

Film production companies of Mexico
Mass media in Mexico City